Edward Clemens Kelley, Jr. (born June 8, 1933) is a former professional American football defensive back in the American Football League. He played in 1961 and 1962 for the Dallas Texans.

References

External links
 

1933 births
Living people
American football defensive backs
Dallas Texans (AFL) players
Texas Longhorns football players
People from Gonzales, Texas
Players of American football from Texas